Nonni's House is a museum in the Akureyri municipality in Iceland. The small wooden house, built around  1850, is one of the oldest houses in Akureyri. It was the home of the well known children's author  and Jesuit priest Jón Sveinsson; also known as "Nonni". The museum was started in 1957 by the Zonta Club but they gave it to the Akureyri municipality in 2008.

References

Buildings and structures in Akureyri
Houses in Iceland
Biographical museums in Iceland
Literary museums in Iceland